Call Me No One (sometimes abbreviated as CMNO) was an American hard rock band founded by Sevendust members Clint Lowery and Morgan Rose in 2012. It was later extended with Rek Mohr (Leo/Hurt) on bass and Souls Harbor guitarist/bassist and Shinedown touring guitarist Alan Price on guitar.

The band entered the studio on January 22, 2012, to begin recording their debut album Last Parade, which was ultimately released on June 5, 2012, via 7 Bros. Records (through a partnership with Asylum). Their first single, "Biggest Fan", was released onto digital media outlets on April 24, 2012. Subsequently, a tour followed in the late summer alongside the bands Nonpoint and Eye Empire.

Talking about the project Lowery has explained that "It all has a dark spooky twist to it; kind of Nine Inch Nails meets Foo Fighters. [...] We felt like it was time to explore a little bit beyond Sevendust.", and also that the sound of the band is "...a lot different from Sevendust, it's hard but it's not the same type of heavy that Sevendust is.".

Recently Clint Lowery mentioned that there will be no more Call Me No One. He's added that it was a one time deal.

Discography

Studio albums

Singles

Band members 
 Clint Lowery – lead vocals, guitar
 Morgan Rose – drums, percussion

Touring musicians
 Rek Mohr – bass
 Alan Price – guitar

References

External links 
Official CMNO Website
Official Clint Lowery Website
Alien Freak Wear – Official Morgan Rose Website 

Musical groups established in 2012
American hard rock musical groups
2012 establishments in the United States
American alternative metal musical groups